Anders Rekdal (born 4 January 1987) is a Norwegian freestyle skier. He represented Norway at the 2010 Winter Olympics in Vancouver.

References

External links

1987 births
Norwegian male freestyle skiers
Olympic freestyle skiers of Norway
Freestyle skiers at the 2010 Winter Olympics
Living people